Six Hills, Sixhills, and Six Hill may refer to:

Six Hills, a collection of Roman barrows in Hertfordshire, England
Sixhills, a village in Lincolnshire, England
Six Hill, West Virginia, an unincorporated community in Ritchie County

See also
Sixhills Priory, in Lincolnshire, England